Tyne Association F.C. was an English association football club, the first association club from Newcastle-upon-Tyne.

History
The club was founded in 1877, by public schoolboys returning home from term; these included pupils from the leading association-playing teams such as Charterhouse School.  Being the first club in the town, the club's early games were internal matches between its members, or matches against Northumberland Rugby Club under a mixture of codes.

In 1879-80 the club entered the FA Cup and lost in the first round to Blackburn Rovers.  It did not enter again until 1886-87, losing once more in the first round, to the professional side of Redcar.  It was the club's last FA Cup entry, as at the end of the season the club was disbanded.

Colours

The club wore yellow and black halves.

References

Defunct football clubs in England
Defunct football clubs in Tyne and Wear
Association football clubs established in the 19th century